The Ebbsfleet Academy (formerly Swan Valley Community School) is a coeducational secondary school with academy status, located in Swanscombe in the English county of Kent.

The school converted to academy status on 1 November 2013 and was renamed The Ebbsfleet Academy. Until 2021 the school was sponsored by The Brook Learning Trust, but it was previously a community school administered by Kent County Council. However The Ebbsfleet Academy continues to coordinate with Kent County Council for admissions. It was taken on by the Leigh Academies Trust in 2021.

The Ebbsfleet Academy offers GCSEs and BTECs as programmes of study for pupils. The school is located at a community campus which includes a health centre, library and pharmacy and is adjacent to the Manor Primary School.

References

External links
The Ebbsfleet Academy official website

Secondary schools in Kent
Academies in Kent